Norwegian Sign Language, or NSL (Norwegian  or , NTS), is the principal sign language in Norway. There are many sign language organizations and some television programs broadcast in NSL in Norway.

NSL is an official language as of 1 January 2022.

Relation to Malagasy Sign Language 
The language is sometimes reported to be similar, or even identical to the sign language used in Madagascar. In fact, while Norwegian Sign Language may have influenced Malagasy sign language via the creation of schools for the deaf by Norwegian Lutheran missionaries, the languages are quite distinct. Out of a sample of 96 sign pairs, 18 pairs were identical between the two languages, 26 showed some level of similarity, and 52 appeared completely unrelated. It is not yet known to what degree the similarities are a result of direct borrowing, borrowing from a common source language (such as ASL or International Sign, mimesis of the thing they refer to, or sheer coincidence.

See also  
 Norway
 Norwegian Association of the Deaf
 Deaf culture
 Deaf rights movement

References

External links
 NTS Dictionary
 WikiSigns.org – Malagasy Sign Language Dictionary

French Sign Language family
Danish Sign Language family
Languages of Norway